Amir Malush Abrashi (born 27 March 1990) is an Albanian professional footballer who plays as a defensive midfielder for Swiss club Grasshoppers and the Albania national team.

Club career

Early career
Abrashi was born in Bischofszell, Switzerland, to Albanian parents from Gjakova, Kosovo who had emigrated in Switzerland before his birth. He grew up in the Canton of Thurgau region and began his career in 2002 at the age of 12 with his hometown club, FC Bischofszell. A year later, he moved to FC Weinfelden-Bürglen, where he spent two years before returning to his hometown club FC Bischofszell. However, just a month after his return, at age of 16 Abrashi moved to Winterthur along with his family, where he joined local side FC Winterthur, the club where he would remain for the remainder of his youth career.

Winterthur

Reserve team
Following impressive performances with the youth teams, Abrashi was first called up to the reserve side towards the end of the 2006–07 season, making his debut on 16 May 2007 in a goalless draw against GC Biaschesi, coming on in the 81st minute for Micha Iseli. Ten days later he was in the starting formation for the 3–2 away win against FC Chur 97. He finished his first season with the reserve team by scoring twice in 14 appearances.

The following season, he started in the youth team but was promoted permanently a few months into the season, and on 11 November 2007 he came on as a late substitute in a 4–3 loss against FC St. Gallen II. He started the following game which was the 4–1 win against FC Herisau in which Abrashi scored his first competitive goal in the final moments. He became a regular in the squad's starting line-up for the second half of the season, scoring he second of the campaign against Baden. Abrashi played 16 matches and scored 2 goals in the 2007–08 season.

Senior team
Abrashi's impressive performance in the reserve team caught the attention of the first team coach Mathias Walther, who included the 18-year-old in his squad for the Challenge League class against La Chaux-de-Fonds on 27 April 2008. Abrashi came on as a 67th-minute substitute for fellow Albanian Sehar Fejzulahi in the 1–0 away loss. He made 2 more appearances off the bench for the senior side against FC Lugano and SR Delémont, respectively.

Abrashi had his breakthrough season during the 2008–09 campaign where he played 24 matches and scored once. That goal came on 8 August 2008 in the 0–2 away win at La Chaux-de-Fonds. He also retained his spot in the 2009–10 season, making 28 league appearances and scoring 3 goals as Winterthur finished 3rd in the championship, missing out the promotion play-off for only 3 points.

Abrashi made 55 league appearances and 3 cup appearances, scoring 5 goals before leaving for top flight side Grasshopper Club Zürich.

Grasshoppers
In July 2010, Abrashi was sent on a one-year loan at Grasshopper Club Zürich. He was handed squad number 8, and made his competitive debut on 25 July as a substitute in the team's 2–0 away loss to FC Zürich. This was also his first ever Swiss Super League appearance in his career. Abrashi was also included in Ciriaco Sforza's team for the 2010–11 UEFA Europa League campaign, making his debut on 19 August in the first leg of play-off round against Steaua București finished in a 1–0 away loss. He also played in the returning leg as the regular and extra time finished 1–0 for Grasshopper, which lead the match to penalty shootouts where the team was defeated 4–3 despite Abrashi successfully scoring his attempt.

Abrashi scored his maiden Grasshopper goal on 17 October in the 0–12 hammering of Gumefens/Sorens in the Round 2 of Swiss Cup. His first score-sheet contributions in league came on matchday 14 where he scored the opener in an eventual 2–0 home win against St. Gallen. He finished his first season with Grasshopper by making 33 appearances in all competitions, including 27 in league, scoring 4 goals, equaling his personal best set in the last season, as the team finished 7th in the championship, was eliminated in the quarter-final of Swiss Cup by Sion despite Abrashi's goal and was eliminated in the play-off round of Europa League.

Following the end of the loan, Abrashi's transfer was made permanent for a fee of €600,000. His second season in Grasshopper was marred by injuries as on 27 August 2011 in the league match against Luzern he suffered a Cruciate Ligament Rupture injury which kept him sidelined until February of the following year. Abrashi's on field return occurred on 17 March as he played in the last minutes of a 2–0 home win over Young Boys for the Swiss Super League matchday 25. He was able to make only 16 appearances during this season, 15 of them in league, collecting 1091 minutes.

Abrashi won his first silverware with Grasshopper in the 2012–13 season, as he contributed with 6 matches, including the final, as the team defeated Basel 4–3 on penalties after regular and extra time had ended 1–1 to win their 19th Swiss Cup in history. It was also the club's first trophy in 10 years. He scored his first league goal in almost two years on 19 August in the 0–2 away win over Luzern. He finished his third season with the club by playing 33 matches between league and cup, scoring 3 times as the team finished runner-up in the championship, missing the title to Basel for only 3 points.

Grasshoper's second place in the championship league meant that they have qualified in the 2013–14 UEFA Champions League third qualifying round. Abrashi made his UEFA Champions League debut on 30 July 2014 in the first leg against Lyon which finished in a 1–0 away loss. The team were also defeated in the second leg and were reduced in the UEFA Europa League play-off round where they faced Fiorentina. Abrashi scored his first and only goal of the season on 14 September in the 2013–14 Swiss Cup Round 2 against Stade Nyonnais; he netted the goal in the 121st minute to give Grasshoper a 4–1 win and progression to the next round. Abrashi made his 100th Swiss Super League appearance on 15 May 2014 in the 4–1 home win against Luzern in the matchday 35. He finished his fourth Grasshoper season by making 40 appearances in all competitions, setting a new personal best as the team finished runner-up once again in the championship.

In the 2014–15 season, Abrashi scored his first European goal. The goal came on 5 August 2014 in the returning leg of 2014–15 UEFA Champions League third qualifying round against Lille; the match finished in a 1–1 away draw which was not enough for Grasshoper who was eliminated 3–1 on aggregate. In December 2014, Abrashi announced that he would not extend his contract with the club. In February 2015, he confirmed that 2014–15 season would be his last with Grasshoper, adding that he will pursue a career outside of Switzerland. He finished his 5th and final season with Grasshopper by making 33 appearances in all competitions, including 26 in league, scoring 3 times. Overall, Abrashi played 127 matches in league, 18 in cup and 10 in UEFA competitions, scoring 11 goals in the process.

SC Freiburg
On 3 June 2015, it was announced the Abrashi had successfully completed a move to German side SC Freiburg. He was presented on the same day, where he signed the three-year deal and was given the squad number 6.

Abrashi made his official debut with the club on 27 July 2015 in the opening match of 2. Bundesliga against Nürnberg, playing full-90 minutes in a 6–3 home win. He scored his first goal for the team on 11 September in Freiburg's 2–0 defeat of Kaiserslautern. He quickly established himself in the starting lineup, becoming an important instrument in the team's midfield, playing 33 league match throughout the season, as the team achieved the promotion to Bundesliga by winning the league.

Abrashi made his Bundesliga debut on 28 August 2016 in the opening league match of 2016–17 season, playing full-90 minutes in team's 2–1 away defeat to Hertha BSC in the last moments. After remaining on the bench for half of September, he returned and scored his first top flight goal on 29 October in Freiburg's 3–1 defeat of Werder Bremen. On 19 December, he agreed a contract extension, signing until 2020, with the new deal including a significant wage rise.

In November 2017, Abrashi suffered an injury which kept him sidelined for the next two months. He returned in action in the first days of 2018 by scoring a header in a friendly versus Bundesliga side Hamburger SV which ended in a 1–1 draw. He was injured again on 10 March 2018 in the league encounter against Hertha BSC, cracking the knee in the 29th minute, which ruled him out for the remaining of the season. He remained sidelined for almost a year, returning to training only in January 2019, and played his first match a month later, starting in a goalless draw against Schalke 04.

Loan to FC Basel 
On 27 January 2021, Abrashi moved on loan to Swiss club FC Basel. Basel confirmed the loan deal with Abrashi on the same day and that the contract would last until the end of the season. Abrashi joined Basel's first team during the winter break of their 2020–21 season under head coach Ciriaco Sforza. He played his domestic league debut for the club in the home game in the St. Jakob-Park four days later, on 31 January, as Basel played a 2–2 draw with Lugano. At the end of the loan period Abrashi had played a total of 10 games for Basel without scoring a goal. All of these games were in the Super League.

Return to Grasshoppers
On 23 June 2021 he returned to Grasshoppers on a two-year contract. He immediately took up captaining duties in the team's first season back in the Swiss Super League. While his return was widely celebrated among the fans, it didn't go as smoothly as hoped, as he received four yellow cards in his first four games. In his first derby back in Zurich, he managed to receive two yellows within the span of a minute shortly after halftime. He was further plagued with injury for the remainder of 2021. He supplied his first goal contribution since his return on 24 April 2022, in a 3–1 victory over Lausanne-Sport. 

On 23 January 2023, he extended his contract with Grasshoppers for a further year until June 2024.

International career

Switzerland

Amir Abrashi was an important player of Swiss youth national teams, earning more than 40 caps in total. The highlights of his career for Switzerland were the achievement of runner-up at the 2011 UEFA European Under-21 Championship, coming on as a second-half substitute in the final against Spain (0–2), and the subsequent participation in the 2012 Summer Olympics as a regular player where Switzerland lost in the group games against the later Gold Medalist Mexico (0–1) and Bronze Medal winner South Korea (1–2), while achieving a 1–1 draw against Gabun.

Abrashi, who was serving for the Swiss Army, repeatedly stated his wish to play for the Swiss national team in the future: "That's no question for me. I grew up here and I feel like a Swiss." However, the big competition for a spot in the Swiss national team on his position of central midfield by such players as Valon Behrami, team captain Gökhan Inler, Granit Xhaka, Blerim Dzemaili, Pajtim Kasami, Gelson Fernandes, Fabian Frei, or Pirmin Schwegler made him reconsider his decision. In a long talk with Ottmar Hitzfeld in May 2013, the Swiss national team coach told Abrashi that he is following his development closely and would like Abrashi to play for Switzerland in the future, but given the competition on his position, he would need patience in order to catch a regular spot in the team. After this talk, Abrashi decided to play for the Albanian football association in the future, stating: "It hurts that I can't play for Switzerland, which would have been my first choice, but the step to become a national team player is important in this stage of my career as a footballer. I cannot wait until I'm 26."

Albania
In order to become a national team player for Albania, not only Abrashi himself but also his parents, who hail from Kosovo, had to apply for Albanian passports. On 24 May 2013, Abrashi received Albanian citizenship along with four fellow Albanian international players at the time, Jurgen Gjasula, Ilir Berisha, Azdren Llullaku, and Vullnet Basha.

Abrashi received his first call up later in June 2013 by manager Gianni De Biasi for the 2014 FIFA World Cup qualification match against Norway. On 3 June, FIFA gave the go ahead for Abrashi to play for Albania also in international official matches.

Abrashi earned his first Albania cap on 14 August in a friendly match against Armenia; he played for 76 minutes as starter, helping the team win 2–0 at Qemal Stafa Stadium. Abrashi was part of the team also for the September matches against Slovenia and Iceland; his competitive debut occurred against Slovenia, who defeated Albania 1–0 at Stožice Stadium, with Abrashi playing in the last 10 minutes.

Abrashi was called up for the 2014 FIFA World Cup qualification matches against Slovenia on 6 September 2013 and Iceland on 10 September 2013. He made his official international debut on 6 September 2013 against Slovenia coming on as a substitute in the 80th minute in place of Migjen Basha. Abrashi made three appearances in Albania's unsuccessful campaign, as they ended Group E in fifth place with only 11 points.

On 21 May 2016, Abrashi was named in Albania's preliminary 27-man squad for UEFA Euro 2016, and in Albania's final 23-man UEFA Euro squad on 31 May.

Abrashi played every minute of all Group A matches as Albania were eliminated by ranking in the 3rd place behind hosts France against which they lost 2–0 and Switzerland against which they also lost 1–0 in the opening match and ahead of Romania by beating them 1–0 in the closing match with a goal by Armando Sadiku. Albania finished the group in the third position with three points and with a goal difference –2, and was ranked last in the third-placed teams, which eventually eliminated them.

Career statistics

Club

International

Scores and results list Albania's goal tally first, score column indicates score after each Abrashi goal.

Honours

Club
Grasshopper
Swiss Cup: 2012–13
Swiss Super League: Runner-up 2012–13, 2013–14

SC Freiburg
2. Bundesliga: 2015–16
Switzerland U21
UEFA Under-21 European Championship runner-up:2011

References

External links

 
 
 
 
 football.ch profile
 Amir Abrashi profile at FSHF.org
 Amir Abrashi – Euro 2016 profile at FSHF.org

1990 births
Living people
People from Weinfelden District
Swiss people of Albanian descent
Association football midfielders
Albanian men's footballers
Swiss men's footballers
Albania international footballers
Switzerland youth international footballers
Switzerland under-21 international footballers
Footballers at the 2012 Summer Olympics
Olympic footballers of Switzerland
UEFA Euro 2016 players
Grasshopper Club Zürich players
FC Winterthur players
SC Freiburg players
FC Basel players
Swiss Super League players
Swiss Challenge League players
Bundesliga players
2. Bundesliga players
Regionalliga players
Albanian expatriate footballers
Albanian expatriate sportspeople in Germany
Expatriate footballers in Germany
Sportspeople from Thurgau